FBT may refer to:

 Farm Business Tenancy, a form of tenancy in England and Wales made under the Agricultural Tenancies Act 1995
 FBT (company), a Thai sports apparel brand
 First Bank and Trust, US
 Flyback transformer
 Fringe benefits tax
 Fringe benefits tax (Australia)
 Fringe benefits tax (New Zealand)
 Fringe benefits tax (India)
 Folate-biopterin transporter family
 Frost Bank Tower,  Austin, Texas, US
 Greg Mueller (born 1971), Canadian poker player, nicknamed FBT